Kalyug is the first novel of R. Sreeram to be published. Released in 2014 by Westland Press's Tranquebar imprint, Kalyug is about a fictional bloodless coup in India in 2012 following the death of a decorated war veteran, Major General Iqbal Qureshi. Drawing parallels from India of those days, Kalyug is part-satire, part-fiction and was noted for its subtle references to real-world incidents and characters.

Summary 
The death of a decorated war veteran, one of India's foremost military officials, triggers a chain of events that threatens to spiral out of control. The democratically elected government is overthrown and a new, fierce one is formed in its place.

Caught in the middle is Bala Murali Selvam, a writer who is still tormented by the memories of his persecution at the hands of the erstwhile-establishment. As the new government battles factions fighting for control, international intervention, personal agendas and incompatible motives, Selvam is swept along, a bewildered-pawn in a high-stakes game. Forced to question everything he has believed so far, even his innate sense of justice, Selvam struggles to choose sides. Will his instincts fail him when he needs them the most?

Background 
According to the author, Kalyug was inspired in part by the Emergency. There are also references to events that happened in 2012 and 2013, particularly the scams that exposed the contemporary government to a lot of ridicule.

Reception 
Kalyug has received good reviews from many readers on account of its fast pace, relevance and thought-provoking passages. Critics have pulled up the rather sudden ending, calling it clichéd in contrast to the unusual narrative that preceded it.

References 

Indian thriller novels
2014 Indian novels
Indian political novels
Westland Books books